Evan Cooper may refer to:
 Evan Cooper, former football player
 Evan Cooper (Shortland Street), a fictional character on the New Zealand soap opera Shortland Street
Evan Cooper, founder of the Life Extension Society